Tappeh Kabud (also Romanized as Tappeh Kabūd; also known as Tappeh Kabūd-e Bālā) is a village in Jeygaran Rural District, Ozgoleh District, Salas-e Babajani County, Kermanshah Province, Iran. At the 2006 census, its population was 33, in 7 families.

References 

Populated places in Salas-e Babajani County